Cheshmeh Kuzan may refer to:

Cheshmeh Kuzan-e Olya